Gekko jinjiangensis is a species of gecko. It is found in the Jinsha River area, where the species gets its specific epithet. It is nocturnal and inhabits on dry cliffs and the walls of buildings.

References 

Gekko
Reptiles described in 2021